The Big Soul of John Lee Hooker is an album by the blues musician John Lee Hooker, recorded in Chicago and released by the Vee-Jay label in 1963.

Reception

AllMusic reviewer Bruce Eder stated: "John Lee Hooker gives us value for every second there is, and in a totally unexpected setting. Jumping into the R&B and soul explosions of the early '60s... this is near-essential listening as some of Hooker's most interesting work of the '60s".

Track listing
All compositions credited to John Lee Hooker
 "San Francisco" – 2:46
 "Take a Look at Yourself" – 2:48
 "Send Me Your Pillow" – 2:25
 "She Shot Me Down" – 2:50
 "I Love Her" – 2:14
 "Old Time Shimmy" – 2:21
 "You Know I Love You" – 1:56
 "Big Soul" – 2:09
 "Good Rockin' Mama" – 2:28
 "Onions" – 2:10
 "No One Told Me" – 2:08

Personnel
John Lee Hooker – guitar, vocals
Unidentified musician – trumpet
Hank Cosby – tenor saxophone
Andrew "Mike" Terry – baritone saxophone
Joe Hunter – keyboards 
Larry Veeder – guitar
James Jamerson – bass
Benny Benjamin – drums
Mary Wilson, The Andantes – vocals (tracks 1, 2, 4, 5, 8, 9 & 11)

References

John Lee Hooker albums
1963 albums
Vee-Jay Records albums